The World's Most Dangerous Ideas is a September/October 2004 special report published in the bimonthly American magazine Foreign Policy.

Criteria
Eight notable authors were asked to issue an early warning on the ideas or ideologies that will be most destructive in the coming years.

Nominees
War on evil (Robert Wright) 
Business as usual at the U.N. (Samantha Power)   
Transhumanism (Francis Fukuyama) 
Free money (Alice Rivlin) 
Undermining free will (Paul Davies) 
Spreading democracy (Eric Hobsbawm) 
Religious intolerance (Martha Nussbaum) 
Hating America (Fareed Zakaria)

Criticism
Some of the nominated ideas have elicited accusations of alarmism by others.

References 

2004 documents
Ideologies
World's Most Dangerous Ideas
Prediction